Bylany is name of several locations in the Czech Republic:

 Bylany (archaeology), an excavated Neolithic settlement, Central Bohemian Region
 Bylany (Chrudim District), a village in the Pardubice Region